The Federal Reserve Bank of Cleveland is the Cleveland-based headquarters of the U.S. Federal Reserve System's Fourth District. The district is composed of Ohio, western Pennsylvania, eastern Kentucky, and the northern panhandle of West Virginia. It has branch offices in Cincinnati and Pittsburgh. The check processing center in Columbus, Ohio, was closed in 2005. The chief executive officer and president is Loretta Mester.

The bank building is a 13-story 203 foot high-rise, located at Superior Avenue and East 6th Street in downtown Cleveland was designed by the Cleveland firm of Walker and Weeks and completed in 1923. Its exterior architecture emulates an Italian Renaissance palazzo, and is clad in Georgia pink marble.  An extension to the building designed by HOK was completed in 1998, providing new facilities for check processing and cash handling. The building is listed on the National Register of Historic Places.
The building's entrances feature allegorical sculptures by Henry Hering representing Security and Integrity flanking the East Sixth Street entrance, while his Energy watches the Superior Avenue entry.

Its original  bank vault door is the largest in the world and was designed by Frederick S. Holmes. It incorporates the largest hinge ever built. The vault's use was discontinued in 1997, though it is preserved intact for posterity.

Learning Center and Money Museum

In January 2006, the bank opened the Learning Center and Money Museum, replacing the public teller windows vacated after September 11, 2001. Over 30 hands-on exhibits focus on the history of money, its effects on societies and cultures, and its central role in peoples' lives.  The museum is open from Monday through Thursday, except for bank holidays, and admission is free.

The museum includes a variety of activities and multi-media experiences to educate visitors, including computerized games about trading, writing contests, crayon rubbings, videos, speeches, films, and virtual tours, One recent addition to the Learning Center and Money Museum is the documentary titled "The Panic of 1907" which details how the panic led to the creation of the Federal Reserve System.  This film was produced by Joseph G. Haubrich and the Federal Reserve Bank of Cleveland.

Board of directors
The following people are listed as on the board of directors .  Class A directors are elected by member banks to represent member banks. Class B directors are elected by member banks to represent the public. Class C directors are appointed by the Board of Governors to represent the public. Terms always expire on December 31 of their final year on the board.

See also

 Federal Reserve Act
 Federal Reserve Bank of Cleveland Cincinnati Branch Office
 Federal Reserve Bank of Cleveland Pittsburgh Branch Office
 Federal Reserve System
 Federal Reserve Districts
 Federal Reserve Branches
 Structure of the Federal Reserve System

References

External links

Images and architectural information
Historical resources by and about the Federal Reserve Bank of Cleveland including annual reports back to 1916

Government buildings completed in 1923
Buildings and structures in Cleveland
Cleveland
Government buildings on the National Register of Historic Places in Ohio
Renaissance Revival architecture in Ohio
National Register of Historic Places in Cleveland, Ohio
Economy of the Midwestern United States
Economy of Cleveland
Skyscraper office buildings in Cleveland
1923 establishments in Ohio
Downtown Cleveland